Nield is a surname. Notable people with the surname include:

Basil Nield (1903–1996), British politician
George C. Nield, US government regulator, Office of Commercial Space
Herbert Nield (1862–1932), British politician
Lawrence Nield, Australian architect
Wallace E. Nield (1889–1950), American politician

See also
Nields (disambiguation)
Neild